Lee Roy Jordan (born April 27, 1941) is a former American football linebacker. After attending the University of Alabama, playing under head coach Paul "Bear" Bryant, he played 14 years in the National Football League (NFL) for the Dallas Cowboys from 1963 to 1976. He was inducted into the College Football Hall of Fame in 1983.

Early years
Born and raised in Excel, Alabama, Jordan was the fifth of seven children of Walter Sr. and Cleo Jordan. He has three older brothers Walter Jr., Carl and Bennie Ray and three sisters Lottie, Agnes and Darlene (who died at age 2 of leukemia). He was a standout at fullback at Excel High School and graduated in 1959. He played college football for the University of Alabama in Tuscaloosa under head coach Paul "Bear" Bryant.

Jordan excelled as both a linebacker and center for the Crimson Tide. In his sophomore season of 1960, he helped the Crimson Tide finish with an 8–1–2 record. In the Bluebonnet Bowl, versus the Texas Longhorns, he was named the game's MVP in a 3–3 tie.

The following year, Jordan was again an important part of the team as Alabama finished with an 11–0 record, a SEC Championship, and the 1961 national championship. The season included six shutouts, which included a 34–0 win over rival Auburn. Led by senior quarterback Pat Trammell (1940–1968), Alabama wrapped up the season with a 10–3 victory over Arkansas in the Sugar Bowl.

In his senior season in 1962, the Crimson Tide fell short of another national championship with a 10–1 record with sophomore quarterback Joe Namath. The loss was by one point at Georgia Tech in mid-November, their first defeat in over two years. In his final game for the Tide, Jordan recorded 31 tackles in a 17–0 victory over Oklahoma in the Orange Bowl, attended by President Kennedy. For his performance, he received his second MVP award in a bowl game. At the end of his senior year, he received unanimous All-American status and the Lineman of the Year award.

During his career for Alabama, Jordan received high praise from Bryant, who stated, "He was one of the finest football players the world has ever seen. If runners stayed between the sidelines, he tackled them. He never had a bad day, he was 100 percent every day in practice and in the games."

In early August 1963 in Chicago, he was part of the College All-Star team that defeated the defending champion Green Bay Packers.

In 1980, he was inducted into the Alabama Sports Hall of Fame. In 1983, he was inducted into the College Football Hall of Fame. In 1988, he received the NCAA Silver Anniversary Award.

Professional career
Jordan was selected sixth overall in the 1963 NFL draft by the Dallas Cowboys, and was the fourteenth overall pick in the AFL draft, taken by the Boston Patriots. He chose the NFL and signed in early January. During preseason in 1963 he was named the Cowboys' weakside linebacker and became the first rookie linebacker in franchise history to start a season-opener.

He shared time with Jerry Tubbs at middle linebacker in 1965, then took over and teamed up with Chuck Howley and Dave Edwards to form one of the greatest linebacking corps in NFL history. His teammates nicknamed him "Killer" and named him team captain for the defense.

In 1971, he had a team-record 21 tackles against Philadelphia Eagles on September 26. On November 4, 1973, he intercepted three passes in the first quarter from the Cincinnati Bengals' Ken Anderson within the span of five minutes, returning one 31 yards for a touchdown. The picks were collectively named one of the ten most memorable moments in the history of Texas Stadium by ESPN in 2008.

Head coach Tom Landry said of Jordan, "He was a great competitor. He was not big for a middle linebacker, but because of his competitiveness, he was able to play the game and play it well. His leadership was there and he demanded a lot out of the people around him as he did of himself." He ran Landry's "Flex" defense on the field with unmatched intensity and efficiency. He watched game film endlessly; his contract included a projector for his home.

He became the franchise's all-time leader in solo tackles (743) in his 14 seasons with the Cowboys.  He was a two-time All-Pro and a five-time Pro Bowler.  He also helped the Cowboys to three Super Bowls and five NFC Championship games. Jordan was an able defender against the run and pass, and had a penchant for recovering loose footballs. He remains tied for second in club history with 18 career fumble recoveries.

More than 25 years after his retirement, Jordan still ranks second in Cowboys' history in career solo tackles with 743, second in career assisted tackles with 493, second in combined total tackles with 1,236 and first with 154 consecutive starts. He also holds the third and fourth highest totals of solo tackles in a single season with 100 in 1975 and 97 in 1968. In his 14 NFL seasons, he intercepted 32 passes (seventh in club history), returning them for 472 yards and three touchdowns.

He was selected to Cowboys Silver Season All-Time Team. In 1988, he was among fifteen finalists for induction into the Pro Football Hall of Fame but did not make the cut (among those finalists, him and Lou Rymkus are the only ones who did not eventually become elected into the Hall). In 1989, he became the seventh member of the Dallas Cowboys Ring of Honor. He was the first member inducted by Jerry Jones.

In 2018, the Professional Football Researchers Association named Jordan to the PFRA Hall of Very Good Class of 2018

Personal life
Jordan married his college sweetheart, Mary "Biddie" Banks of Eutaw, and they had three sons, David, Lee and Chris Jordan.

Jordan currently heads the Lee Roy Jordan Lumber Company, headquartered in Dallas.

Video
Alabama Crimson Tide football – 1963 Orange Bowl

See also
Most consecutive starts by a middle linebacker

References

External links
 
 Dallas Cowboys Ring of Honor: Lee Roy Jordan
 Dallas Cowboys Top 50 players
 Alabama Crimson Tide football – All-Americans
Alabama Sports Hall of Fame – Lee Roy Jordan
 

1941 births
Living people
People from Monroe County, Alabama
Players of American football from Alabama
All-American college football players
American football linebackers
Alabama Crimson Tide football players
Dallas Cowboys players
Eastern Conference Pro Bowl players
National Conference Pro Bowl players
College Football Hall of Fame inductees